Samvel Avanesovich Grigoryan (April 20, 1907 in Shushikend, Nagorno-Karabakh – June 7, 1987) was Soviet Armenian poet and translator.

Life 
Samvel Grigoryan was born to family of blacksmiths. In 1926 he joined the History and Literature Department of the Yerevan University, graduating in 1929, began his literary activities in 1925. Honored Worker of Culture of Azerbaijan SSR (1970). People's Poet of Azerbaijan SSR (1984). Member of the Supreme Council of the Azerbaijan SSR (1959-1985). He was awarded the Order of the Red Banner on April 27, 1967.

References 

1907 births
1987 deaths
People from Khojaly District
20th-century male writers
20th-century translators
Recipients of the Order of Friendship of Peoples
Recipients of the Order of the Red Banner of Labour
Members of the Supreme Soviet of the Azerbaijan Soviet Socialist Republic
Armenian male poets
Soviet Armenians
Soviet male writers
Soviet poets
Soviet translators